The Viceroy of the Three Northeast Provinces, fully referred to in Chinese as the Governor-General of the Three Northeast Provinces and Surrounding Areas Overseeing Military Generals of the Three Provinces, Director of Civil Affairs of Fengtian (Manchu: dergi ilan goloi uheri kadalara amban), sometimes referred to as the Viceroy of Manchuria, was a regional viceroy in China during the Qing dynasty. It was the only regional viceroy whose jurisdiction was outside China proper. The Viceroy had control over Fengtian (present-day Liaoning), Jilin and Heilongjiang provinces in Northeast China, which was also known as Manchuria.

History
The office of the Viceroy of the Three Northeast Provinces previously existed as the "General of Liaodong", which was created in 1662 during the reign of the Kangxi Emperor. The post was subsequently renamed to "General of Fengtian" and "General of Shengjing".

In 1876, during the reign of the Guangxu Emperor, the General of Shengjing was given additional concurrent appointments as Secretary of Defence and Secretary of Justice and Prefect of Fengtian Prefecture. He also gained honorary titles as a Viceroy, Secretary of Defence, and Right Censor-in-Chief of the Detection Branch. In 1907, the offices of General of Jilin, General of Heilongjiang and General of Shengjing were merged under a single office, Viceroy of the Three Northeast Provinces. The Viceroy also received an additional honorary title as an Imperial Commissioner.

From 1910 to 1911, the Viceroy concurrently held the appointment of Provincial Governor of Fengtian.

List of Viceroys of the Three Northeast Provinces

See also
 Manchuria under Qing rule

References

 

History of Liaoning
History of Jilin
History of Heilongjiang
History of Manchuria